James A. Nicholas (1921 – July 15, 2006) was an orthopedic surgeon and a pioneer in the treatment of athletic injuries who was best known for performing four knee operations that saved the career of Hall of Fame quarterback Joe Namath. Nicholas was among the best-known orthopedic surgeons in the United States as a physician for the New York Jets, the New York Knicks and the New York Rangers. In 1973 he established the Nicholas Institute of Sports Medicine and Athletic Trauma at Lenox Hill Hospital in Manhattan, New York. Nicholas was a long time member of Westchester Country Club. He died of colon cancer at age 85.

Nicholas' niece Connie Carberg was the National Football League's first female scout in 1976 for the Jets.

References

External links
New York Times Obituary
NISMAT
James Nicholas, M.D.: "Nick the Knife"

1921 births
2006 deaths
American orthopedic surgeons
New York University alumni
20th-century surgeons